Several ships of the Brazilian Navy have been named Bahia, after the state of Bahia:

 , a river monitor built in 1864 and stricken in 1894
 , lead ship of the s built in 1909 and sunk in 1945.
 , a  purchased from France in 2015.

Brazilian Navy ship names